Events from the year 1540 in Ireland.

Incumbent
Lord: Henry VIII

Events
Anthony St Leger is appointed Lord Deputy of Ireland and tasked with the repression of disorder, beginning the pacification policy of surrender and regrant (which lasts until 1543).
Murrough O'Brien usurps the title of King of Thomond from his nephew, Donough O'Brien.
Dissolution of the Monasteries – establishments dissolved include:
Abbeyderg Abbey, Co. Longford.
Abbeylara Abbey.
Abington Abbey.
Abbey of Aghaboe.
Aghmacart Priory, Co. Laois.
Augustinian Friary of the Holy Trinity and Franciscan Friary, Dublin.
Ballynasaggart Friary, Co. Longford.
Black Abbey, Grey Friary, Kilkenny Abbey and St. John's Abbey, Kilkenny.
Buttevant Franciscan Friary.
Cahir Priory.
Callan Augustinian Friary.
Carrickfergus Friary.
Cashel Dominican and Franciscan Friaries.
Castledermot Friary and Priory.
Clane Friary.
Clonard Abbey.
Clonmel Friary.
Dominican Priory of St Eustace, Naas.
Drogheda Dominican and Franciscan Friaries and Priory Hospitals of St Laurence and St Mary de Urso
Fertagh Priory, Co. Kilkenny.
Fethard Priory.
Galbally Friary, Co. Tipperary.
Great Connell Priory.
Holy Cross Abbey, Holycross.
Hore Abbey.
Inchmore Priory, Lough Gowna.
Inislounaght Abbey.
Inistioge Abbey.
Jerpoint Abbey.
Kells Priory, Co. Kilkenny.
Killerig Preceptory.
Kilmainham Preceptory.
Monasteranenagh Abbey, Co. Limerick.
Red Abbey, Cork.
Slane Friary.
Trim Friary

Births

Deaths

References

 
1540s in Ireland
Ireland
Years of the 16th century in Ireland